Things named after American scientist Josiah Willard Gibbs:

Gibbs algorithm 
Gibbs canonical ensemble
Gibbs distribution
Gibbs elasticity
Gibbs ensemble
Gibbs entropy
Gibbs free energy
Gibbs H-theorem
Gibbs' inequality
Gibbs isotherm
Gibbs lemma
Gibbs measure
Gibbs random field
Gibbs phase rule
Gibbs paradox
Gibbs phenomenon
Gibbs sampling
Gibbs state
Gibbs's thermodynamic surface
Gibbs vector
Gibbs–Appell equation of motion
Gibbs–Donnan effect
Gibbs–Duhem equation
Gibbs–Helmholtz equation
Gibbs–Marangoni effect
Gibbs–Thomson effect
Gibbs–Thomson equation
Gibbs–Wulff theorem
Massieu–Gibbs function

Heavenly bodies
2937 Gibbs (asteroid)
Gibbs (crater)

Other honours
Gibbs Society of Biological Thermodynamics
Josiah Willard Gibbs Lectureship
Willard Gibbs Award

gibbs